When the Corn Is Waving, Annie Dear is a song by Charles Blamphin first published in 1860, popular in the 19th and early 20th century.  It was printed by a number of publishing houses in the United States in 1860 and also eventually became popular in England.

Early recordings of the song include performances by the Apollo Quartet (1911), Knickerbocker Quartet (1914), and Peerless Quartet (1921).

References

External links
 1921 recording by Peerless Quartet (Library of Congress)
 1914 Edison recording by Knickerbocker Quartet
 Aunt Jemima Radio Show Recording (1940s?)

1860 songs